The Topographic Map of Switzerland (German: Topographische Karte der Schweiz), also known as the Dufour Map (German: Dufourkarte; French: Carte Dufour) is a 1:100 000 scale map series depicting Switzerland for the first time based on accurate geometric measurements.  It is also the oldest official map series of Switzerland.

The Atlas Suisse as predecessor 
From 1796 to 1802, the Atlas Suisse was published in Aarau by Johann Heinrich Weiss, Johann Rudolf Meyer and Joachim Eugen Müller.

The Atlas Suisse map series consisted of 16 sheets, was produced by a copperplate or intaglio printing process, and depicted the whole of Switzerland at a scale of 1:120,000.

The Dufour Map

Publication of the Dufour Map was begun in 1845 by the Federal Topographic Bureau under Guillaume-Henri Dufour, and continued to December 1864.  The Dufour Map was based on measurements by the Cantons and the Swiss Confederation.

The original images for the Dufour Map were created in 1:25,000 scale (for the Swiss plateau) and 1:50,000 (for the mountains). However, the Dufour Map was published in 1:100,000 scale, enabling the territory of Switzerland to be divided into 25 sheets, each of which measured  x . 

The Dufour Map was reproduced by an engraving print process, initially by intaglio, and later (from 1905) by flat plate impression.  Until 1939, there were occasional revised editions of the Dufour Map sheets.  The initially monochromatic map was enhanced in 1908 by the addition of an extra color, and then in 1938 by yet another colour.

The countryside (which in Switzerland is mostly hilly or mountainous) is depicted on the Dufour Map with hachures, which makes it appear especially vivid.  Relief and elevation differences under the surface of lakes were symbolized by contours.  This so-called "Swiss style" depiction received much praise, and earned the Topographic Bureau several international awards.

The legacy of the Dufour Map
Dufour's work enabled the Swiss Confederation to have a valuable tool for its army and administration. Some surveys for the map had been conducted by the Cantons, but the federal government had made its contribution by tracking data in mountainous areas with difficult access. These actions had taken place in 1818, and then during the period 1836 to 1862.

The Dufour Map also conveys a precise idea of Swiss geography of the second half of the 19th century and the early 20th century. One can see villages that have disappeared, glaciers that have retreated, and names of mountains that have changed since that time. Different editions of the Dufour Map give a reliable overview of demographic trends in Switzerland, the extension of settlements and significant changes in the territory, such as the damming of rivers, the construction of roads, and railway development.

The Siegfried Map as successor

From 1870, a map series in the 1:25,000 scale of the original Dufour Map images was published under the official name Topographic Atlas of Switzerland (German: Topographischer Atlas der Schweiz), and also known as the Siegfried Atlas or Siegfried Map (German: Siegfriedkarte; French: Carte Siegfried).

External links

 The Dufour Map in the Swiss Parliament Building
 Online access to map.geo.admin.ch

Map series
Map series of Switzerland